This is a list of museums in Angola.

Museums in Angola 

 Museu Nacional de Antropologia
 Museu Nacional de História Natural de Angola
 Musée Régional de Dundo
 Museu Central das Forças Armadas
 Museu Nacional da Escravatura

See also 
 List of museums
 List of libraries in Angola

External links 
 Museums in Angola

 
Angola
Museums
Museums
Museums
Angola